Cogglesford Mill (sometimes referred to as Coggesford) is a Grade II listed working watermill in Sleaford, Lincolnshire. It is possibly the last working Sheriff's Mill in England.

Location
The mill sits to the north of Sleaford on banks of River Slea. The ford from which the mill takes its name is where the Roman road, now called Mareham Lane, crossed the Slea.  The original crossing, no longer extant, is a few hundred yards downstream of the mill, close to the current footbridge.

History
There is archaeological evidence of a Saxon mill on the site and records in the Domesday book of later mills; the present redbrick structure dates to the mid to late 18th century, with alterations from the 19th century. There were many other mills along the river at various times. During the construction of the Sleaford Navigation, in the 1790s, locks were provided at each of the mills to maintain the necessary head of water. After the navigation closed and as the locks fell into disrepair they were replaced by weirs. The weir at Cogglesford is particularly elaborate, having to maintain the head of this still working mill.

Cogglesford mill (including the mill race and bridge) was assigned a listed status on 20 July 1973. The mill is open to the public 7 days a week during the summer and stoneground flour is milled there and sold in the shop.

Gallery

References

Further reading
 N. Pevsner, J. Harris, N. Atram, Buildings of England, vol. 27 (Lincolnshire), 1989 (New Haven, CT: Yale University Press)
 S. A. Savage, Cogglesford Mill, Eastgate, Sleaford, 2007 (Lincoln: Pre-Construct Archaeology Ltd.)

External links

Cogglesford Mill - official site
Virtual tour of the mill
Photographs of the Sleaford Navigation
Sleaford Navigation Trust
Photographs of repairs to the Wheel, by the craftsman involved

Watermills in Lincolnshire
Grade II listed buildings in Lincolnshire
Grade II listed industrial buildings
Museums in Lincolnshire
Mill museums in England
Industrial archaeological sites in England
Grade II listed watermills
Sleaford